David Arnold (born 23 January 1962) is a British film composer whose credits include scoring five James Bond films, as well as Stargate (1994), Independence Day (1996), Godzilla (1998) and the television series Little Britain and Sherlock. For Independence Day he received a Grammy Award for Best Instrumental Composition Written for a Motion Picture or for Television and for Sherlock he, and co-composer Michael Price, won a Creative Arts Emmy for the score of "His Last Vow", the final episode in the third series. Arnold scored the BBC / Amazon Prime series Good Omens (2019) adapted by Neil Gaiman from his book Good Omens, written with Terry Pratchett. Arnold is a fellow of the British Academy of Songwriters, Composers and Authors.

Career
While attending a Sixth Form College in Luton, Arnold became friends with director Danny Cannon. Cannon initially created short films for which Arnold was asked to write the music. The two made their respective major film debuts with The Young Americans. "Play Dead", a song from the film with singer Björk, charted No. 12 in the UK. The following year he scored Stargate and Last of the Dogmen, with excerpts from the former ranking third in the most commonly used soundtrack cues for film trailers.

Arnold then composed music for Stargate director Roland Emmerich's next two movies, Independence Day and Godzilla, as well as four movies for director John Singleton. In addition, he has scored various comedies, dramas, and nineteenth-century period pieces, as well as providing music for several British television shows including the 2000 remake of Randall and Hopkirk (Deceased) and Little Britain. During film production, his compositions are conducted by Nicholas Dodd. In 2010, he composed the music for Come Fly With Me, a British television series from the producers of Little Britain.

He is a member of the British Academy of Songwriters, Composers and Authors (BASCA). On Thursday 29 November 2012, Arnold received an honorary degree from University of West London. Now a university honorary, he will work closely with the University in particular London College of Music, a faculty within the institute. In 2014, he appeared as himself in The Life of Rock with Brian Pern.

Film music concerts
Arnold performed his debut orchestral concert, showcasing his film and television music, on Sunday 6 July 2014 at London's Royal Festival Hall. The line-up featured Nicholas Dodd conducting, David McAlmont as surprise guest vocalist ("My secret weapon!" said Arnold) and the Urban Voices Collective choir, plus Mark Gatiss and Amanda Abbington introducing the suite of Sherlock music, for which Arnold's collaborator on the project, Michael Price, replaced Dodd.

He performed his music in a series of orchestral concerts in 2015: Dublin) in January (with the RTÉ Concert Orchestra); Manchester (with the Manchester Camerata) in April; and London (with the Royal Philharmonic Orchestra), Birmingham and Nottingham (with the City of Birmingham Symphony Orchestra (CBSO)) in June 2015. He was also the special guest at 'The music of David Arnold', a concert in Lucerne in October 2015, with Ludwig Wicki conducting the 21st Century Symphony Orchestra and Chorus. On 5 June 2016 Film Music Prague performed a concert of his work, with Arnold in attendance (and performing) as special guest. In February 2016 the Royal Albert Hall announced the premiere of Independence Day Live on 22 September 2016. This celebrated the 20th anniversary of the film's release with a live orchestral performance. David Arnold gave a pre-show talk about his work and the Royal Philharmonic Concert Orchestra and Maida Vale Singers (conducted by Gavin Greenaway) performed the original music while the film screened. The Upcoming magazine gave the event a five star review noting that "with unrivalled acoustics and a ceiling filled with floating UFO-shaped objects, the Hall set the ideal scene for the audience and the musicians alike" and that the production "kept the audience on the edge of their seats as if the film had just been released for the first time."

Arnold hosted another two concerts of his music in Dublin, at the Bord Gáis Energy Theatre on 19 and 20 May 2017, with the RTÉ Concert Orchestra. The first concert showcased his career in writing music for film and television, the second was Independence Day Live with the film screened as the orchestra played the score alongside. The first James Bond film ever to be screened with a live orchestra was Casino Royale in Concert which took place at the Royal Albert Hall on Saturday 30 September 2017; David Arnold held a pre-concert question and answer session.

James Bond
Arnold was a Bond fan from an early age and also a fan of Bond composer John Barry. In 1997, Arnold produced Shaken and Stirred: The David Arnold James Bond Project, an album featuring new versions of the themes from various James Bond films. The album featured a variety of contemporary artists including Jarvis Cocker, Chrissie Hynde, David McAlmont, Propellerheads and Iggy Pop; a version of You Only Live Twice by Björk was recorded but not included on the album. John Barry, the composer of many of the themes on the album, was complimentary about Arnold's interpretation of his work; "He was very faithful to the melodic and harmonic content, but he's added a whole other rhythmic freshness and some interesting casting in terms of the artists chosen to do the songs. I think it's a terrific album. I'm very flattered." Barry contacted Barbara Broccoli, producer of the then-upcoming Tomorrow Never Dies, to recommend Arnold as the film's composer. Arnold was hired to score the instalment and, returning the compliment to the man he refers to as "The guvnor", included musical references to Barry's score for From Russia with Love, as well as, of course, the James Bond Theme composed by Monty Norman with Barry's arrangement.

Arnold scored the four subsequent Bond films: The World Is Not Enough, Die Another Day (in which he included references to John Barry's score for On Her Majesty's Secret Service), Casino Royale and Quantum of Solace. Arnold did not score the 23rd James Bond film, Skyfall, with Thomas Newman taking his place. Arnold commented that Newman had been selected by the film's director, Sam Mendes, because of their history of working together, rather than because of Arnold's commitment to working with director Danny Boyle as composer for the Opening Ceremony of the 2012 Summer Olympics. However, a part of Arnold's composition work on Casino Royale was reused, with a credit, in Skyfall and again in SPECTRE.

Arnold also co-wrote the main theme songs for The World Is Not Enough ("The World Is Not Enough" by Garbage) and Casino Royale ("You Know My Name" by Chris Cornell), as well as "Surrender" by k.d. lang which appears during the end credits of Tomorrow Never Dies having been originally proposed as the opening theme. Arnold also contributed the main themes to Kevin Kiner's score for Activision's GoldenEye 007, the remake of the 1997 game of the same name.

In 2017, a part of a track entitled "Vesper" from Arnold's composition work on the Casino Royale soundtrack was reused in a Sherlock episode entitled "The Final Problem", the third episode of the fourth series, in a track entitled "Pick Up" composed by Arnold himself and Michael Price.

Other work
Arnold has collaborated with such musical acts as Cast, Kaiser Chiefs, Massive Attack, and Pulp, and solo artists Natasha Bedingfield, Melanie C, Björk, Chris Cornell, Shirley Manson, Mark Morriss, Nina Persson and in 2009 produced Shirley Bassey's album The Performance.

In 2001, he provided a new arrangement of Ron Grainer's Doctor Who theme music for the Eighth Doctor audio dramas from Big Finish Productions. His version was used as the Eighth Doctor theme starting with 2001's Storm Warning until 2008, when it was replaced with a new version arranged by Nicholas Briggs starting with Dead London. Arnold's theme returned to the Eighth Doctor releases with the 2012 box set, Dark Eyes.

Arnold is the second cousin of Irish singer-songwriter Damien Rice, and is an ambassador for aid agency CARE International in the UK. He has made minor appearances in two different episodes of Little Britain as separate characters.

In February 2011, it was announced that he had been appointed Musical Director for the 2012 Olympic Games and the 2012 Paralympic Games in London.

In May 2011, he was part of the United Kingdom's jury for the Eurovision Song Contest 2011.

Arnold took part in a tribute to John Barry on 20 June 2011 at the Royal Albert Hall in London, singing a song that was composed by Barry and playing the guitar part of the James Bond theme.

In 2014, Arnold teamed up with Richard Thomas, to write the music and lyrics for the new West End musical Made in Dagenham.

In October 2015 he collaborated with Lethal Bizzle and Sinead Harnett to create a song combining orchestral, grime and soul elements. The song, 'Come This Far', was performed live at a special event at One Mayfair, as part of Bulmers Cider's LiveColourful LIVE promotion, and made available as a free download from Bulmers' website. He and Sherlock co-composer Michael Price also composed the music for ITV's Jekyll and Hyde television series which premiered in October 2015.

In September 2016 the Royal Albert Hall hosted an orchestral performance of Independence Day with the score performed live to picture, David Arnold gave a pre-show talk.

In 2019, David Arnold provided additional production for Sophie Ellis-Bextor's orchestral album, The Song Diaries. Later in 2020, he co-produced an orchestral cover of 'My Favourite Things' (from The Sound of Music) along with Richard Jones (of The Feeling) for Sophie's 2020 compilation album Songs From The Kitchen Disco.

Acting filmography

Discography

Films

Television

Video games

Web series

Singles in charts

Awards
 Won: Grammy Award – Best Instrumental Composition Written for a Motion Picture or for Television – Independence Day
 Won: Ivor Novello Awards – Best International Film Score for The World Is Not Enough
 Won: Ivor Novello Awards – BASCA Fellowship (2005)
 Nominated: BAFTA Award – Anthony Asquith Award for Film Music – Casino Royale
 Nominated: Grammy Award – Best Song Written for Motion Picture, Television or Other Visual Media – You Know My Name from Casino Royale (songwriter)
 Won: BBC Radio Awards – Best music production – The Sound of Cinema with David Arnold
 Won: (with Michael Price) Primetime Emmy Award for Outstanding Music Composition for a Miniseries, Movie, or a Special – Sherlock ("His Last Vow")

References

External links
 
 David Arnold Twitter feed
 David Arnold Interview at www.reviewgraveyard.com
 BAFTA Video Masterclass with David Arnold
 

1962 births
British classical composers
British contemporary classical composers
British film score composers
British male classical composers
British male film score composers
British television composers
English classical composers
English contemporary classical composers
English film score composers
English male classical composers
English male film score composers
English television composers
Grammy Award winners
Ivor Novello Award winners
La-La Land Records artists
Living people
Male television composers
People from Luton
RCA Victor artists
Varèse Sarabande Records artists